The BBC One "Rhythm & Movement" idents were a set of on-screen channel identities designed by Lambie-Nairn and used on BBC One from 29 March 2002 to 7 October 2006. They replaced the balloon idents, and spelled the end of the much recognised globe identity by the BBC, which had been used in various ways since 1963.

Components of Look
The presentational package featured numerous people of various backgrounds dancing in a predominantly red background to a soundtrack based around an upbeat central jingle. The BBC One logo is now located in a red box, similar in style to BBC Two's idents of the time, with the BBC logo stacked on top of an upper case 'ONE'. The music for all idents was written by Peter Lawlor of Water Music Productions in London. The look was also the first one not to feature a station clock. It has been reported that a station clock was designed for the new look, however BBC Marketing decided not to use it. The concerns with this stemmed around a lack of a serious ident to link into the news, and indeed this problem famously occurred one day into the new look upon the death of The Queen Mother.

Promotional style originally consisted of the BBC One box placed in the lower left corner of the screen throughout the promotion and an end board consisting of a translucent white strip along the bottom containing the box logo. This end board style was recreated for the, less frequently seen, static captions. This style was changed on 1 May 2004 to a plain red background that would close shut over the end of a promotion to contain the programme title. The static slide was also updated, with the space for the programme image reduced to the top quarter of the screen.

Idents

Special Idents

The BBC continued its long tradition of using special idents at Christmas time throughout this branding period. The first ident, Snowflakes featured children dressed as snowflakes falling to earth and running around against a red sky background. This ident was used on 20 December 2002 and, for the first time in its history, was reused again on 19 December 2003. BBC Two also followed suit the same year, although rather than reusing an ident, they were used alongside that year's newer one. This reusing of the previous years ident caused public controversy and, as a result a new ident, entitled Christmas Puddings, was created the following year. The ident featured children dressed in red and bouncing on Space Hoppers that looked like Christmas puddings against a red background. The ident was designed by a young viewer of the children's programme Blue Peter, as part of a competition. A new ident was commissioned for 2005 entitled Christmas Tree. In this one included children, again dressed in red, walking round a giant Christmas tree, carrying brightly coloured balls. The background this time was green, and the look and music has often been compared to the 2005 film Charlie and the Chocolate Factory directed by Tim Burton. On BBC One Wales, on 16 December 2005, an ident was shown to celebrate Wales' win in the 2005 Six Nations Championship. Played to the "Festival" music, it featured Wales supporters celebrating in a public house. The ONE in the BBC ONE box in the bottom-left corner of the screen was replaced with WON.

This look was unusual in that no special idents were produced for events or programmes. However, a way used to promote the third series of Little Britain was for the shows announcer, Tom Baker to provide the continuity announcements for the evening over the normal idents.

Parodies
The idents were very quickly parodied by digital channel E4 in 2002 with spoofs of the Capoeira, Ballet and Acrobat idents.

Comedians French and Saunders also created spoof idents for their 2002 Christmas special in which, dressed as old women, they first copied the Acrobat ident yet came loose from their ribbons and fell to the ground while in a spoof of Hip-Hop, the pair drove around slowly in mobility scooters. The Acrobat parody was also filmed at the Royal Horticultural Society Halls and the Hip-Hop parody was filmed in Sarratt, in which the latter parody had the same setting of the Salsa ident.

Comedian Peter Kay also made spoof editions of the Hip-Hop ident in 2003 in the guise of his Phoenix Nights character Brian Potter. The second version was shown minus the BBC One logo in 2005. This ident was used to introduce the Comic Relief of 2003.

A further spoof featured Jon Culshaw as Tony Blair dancing in a fictional ident outside 10 Downing Street. This was shown on a July 2003 episode of Dead Ringers, broadcast on BBC Two.

Spoofs have also cropped up in BBC Three's animated adult comedy series Monkey Dust, making use of the generic red theme of the normal idents to show short films such as a gangland killing and the resulting aftermath.

Replacement

In August 2005, BBC One controller Peter Fincham had hinted that the dancers may be on their way out. He told the Edinburgh International Television Festival that "It may well be that the time is coming to look at a new way of doing it. No date or direct decision has been made but it's under review".

In September 2005, it was announced that the BBC were working on a new set of idents to replace the dancers. A spokeswoman said "There is an idea for a change, but it is in very early days".

According to the Media Guardian, Fincham then confirmed that in autumn 2006, the 'Rhythm and Movement' idents would be replaced with a new presentation package, along with a new schedule. As speculated, Red Bee Media would create the new presentation package. Red Bee created the new idents for the ITV channels that were introduced in January 2006 (up until 2013). On 26 September the BBC confirmed that from 7 October 2006, the "Rhythm and Movement" idents would be replaced by a new Circle ident collection, including kites, surfers and hippos.

The idents aired for the final time on 7 October 2006, at 1:10am, in which a montage of idents was aired together, ending with the rarely seen 'Ballet' ident. The new idents made their debut on 7 October 2006 at 9:58am BST, marking the end of the "Rhythm and Movement" idents, which had defined the channel for four and a half years.

See also

History of BBC television idents

References

External links
BBC One 'Rhythm & Movement' idents at TV Ark
Video of BBC One 'Rhythm & Movement' collection at idents.tv (includes the "French & Saunders" parodies and final montage)

BBC One
BBC Idents
Television presentation in the United Kingdom